Migration museums cover human migration in the past, present and future.

Background
The current trend in the development of migration museums, named differently worldwide, is an interesting phenomenon, as it may contribute to the creation of a new and multiple identity, at an individual and collective level. The United States with Ellis Island, Australia, Canada, and more recently several European countries — e.g., France, Germany, Italy, the Netherlands, Portugal, Spain, Switzerland, Belgium and the United Kingdom — have been creating such venues to facilitate transmission between generations as well as encounters between migrants and the host populations, by telling their personal story.

While these initiatives also serve the duty to remember, they seem to have three main objectives: Acknowledge, integrate and build awareness

 Acknowledge: The contributions made by migrants to their host societies; the diversity and wealth of the origin cultures and; the right to a dual-belonging.
 Include and Integrate: Foster the sense of belonging; enable the communities to feel as an integral part of the nation; find common ground and contribute to a national identity.
 Build awareness and educate on the events that induced individuals — and refugees in particular — to leave their land, thus developing empathy among the host population. More generally, deconstruct stereotypes on immigration.

Given the international scene and the latest events, from the Van Gogh affair in the Netherlands in 2004 to the so-called ‘crise des banlieues’ in France in 2005there is an urgent need to give the migrant generations (the youth as well as their parents) a voice, in order to foster inclusion, integration and the right to difference. Listening to individual stories may help to deconstruct stereotypes. Memory, History and Narration may also allow to take a step back and to consider the complete picture.

Migration museums also face common challenges, in that they intend to be not only a venue for conservation and exhibition, but also and above all a lively meeting place. The challenge is not so much to bring in the intellectuals, academics, researchers, historians, traditional visitors of museums (the converted) but to attract the general public, those with preconceived ideas on immigration and the migrants themselves.

In addition to the following list, there are many local heritage initiatives and smaller museums which have increasingly focused on migration as a part of the narrative they portray.

List of migration museums

Further reading
Maria Beatriz Rocha-Trindade, Miguel Monteiro (2007), "Museums Devoted to Migration: the Portuguese Emigration Museum", Museum International 59 (1-2), 145–150.
Aytac Eryilmaz,  "The Political and Social Significance of a Museum of Migration in Germany", Museum International, Volume 59, Numbers 1-2, May 2007, pp. 127–136
Viv Szekeres, "Representing diversity and challenging racism: the Migration Museum", in Richard Sandell (editor), Museums, Society, Inequality (Routledge, London, 2002) pp. 142–152

References

External links
 Integration : Building Inclusive Societies (IBIS) UN Alliance of Civilizations online community on Good Practices of Integration of Migrants across the World

Lists of museums by subject
Types of museums